Zok is a language that belongs to the independent branch of Indo-European family, specifically the Armenian language, but it is so distinct that it has been classified as a separate language. Its speakers refer to it as "zokerēn" or the "Zok language". Zok is significantly different from other Armenian varieties, leading to myths about its origins. One common belief is that the Zoks are half-Armenian, half-Jewish merchants who created a secret language to conceal their business dealings from outsiders. However, in reality, the Zoks are an indigenous Armenian community from Nakhichevan.

History 

Originally spoken in Nakhijevan, which is now part of Azerbaijan, the last Armenians of Nakhijevan were forced to leave due to conflict in 1988. In 1935, Zok had approximately 10,000 speakers according to Acharyan, but it is now certain that the number of speakers is much smaller, likely less than 1,000. The Paraka dialect, which will be the focus of this study, is estimated to have fewer than 50 living speakers based on the Armenian National Archive's data of a population of 90 residents in the village at the time of the last Armenian displacement in 1988. Zok's vowel system is the most distinguishable feature that sets it apart from other Armenian dialects, with significant changes and the addition of a unique form of vowel harmony, according to Vaux (2008).

Additionally, Zok has notable morphological and syntactic innovations, particularly in the organization of its tense-aspect-mood system, which is unparalleled in other Armenian dialects.

The language spoken by this group is similar to the neighboring dialects of Karabagh and Julfa.

See also
Agulis (historical)

References

Languages of the Caucasus